Douglas Thomas Piers Pratt (born 14 April 1993) is an English former first-class cricketer.

Pratt was born at Cambridge in April 1993. He was educated at Harrow School, before going up to the University of Leeds. While studying at Leeds, he played two first-class cricket matches for Leeds/Bradford MCCU against Sussex and Yorkshire in 2015. Playing as a right-arm fast-medium bowler, he took 5 wickets in his two matches at an average of 31.00, with best figures of 2 for 51.

References

External links

1993 births
Living people
Sportspeople from Cambridge
People educated at Harrow School
Alumni of the University of Leeds
English cricketers
Leeds/Bradford MCCU cricketers